ZYX or Zyx may refer to:

 Zyx, a region in the North Caucasus inhabited by the Zygii
 Zyx (cartoonist) (1950–2015), French-Canadian cartoonist
 ZyX (company), a Japanese company that makes erotic video games
 ZYX (gene), a gene that encodes the protein Zyxin
 ZYX (magazine), an American literary newsletter
 ZYX (pop group), a Japanese pop group
 ZYX Music, a German record label
 "ZYX", a song by Gomez on their 2006 album Five Men in a Hut: A's, B's and Rarities 1998–2004
 Zyx, a villain in the American TV series Legion of Super Heroes

See also
 ZYYX, a Swedish desktop 3D printer